Baptists in the United States make up a large number of all Baptists worldwide. Approximately 11.3% of Americans identify as Baptist, making Baptists the third-largest religious group in the United States, after Roman Catholics and non-denominational Protestants. Baptists adhere to a congregationalist structure, so local church congregations are generally self-regulating and autonomous, meaning that their broadly Christian religious beliefs can and do vary. Baptists make up a significant portion of evangelicals in the United States (although many Baptist groups are classified as mainline) and approximately one third of all Protestants in the United States. Divisions among Baptists have resulted in numerous Baptist bodies, some with long histories and others more recently organized. There are also many Baptists operating independently or practicing their faith in entirely independent congregations.

English Baptists migrated to the American colonies during the seventeenth century. Baptist theological reflection informed how the colonists understood their presence in the New World, especially in Rhode Island through the preaching of Roger Williams, John Clarke, and others. During the 18th century, the Great Awakening resulted in the conversion of many slaves to Baptist churches, although they were often segregated and relegated lower status within Baptist churches. Although some Baptists opposed slavery during this period, many Baptists in the south remained slave holders and still others considered it a political decision and not a moral issue. Baptist congregations formed their first national organization the Triennial Convention in the early 1800s. The current largest U.S. Baptist denomination, the Southern Baptist Convention, split from Triennial Baptists over their refusal to support slave-owning in 1845. Following abolition, Black Baptist churches were formed due to continued practices of segregation and the mistreatment of Blacks. Today, the largest denominations among African Americans are the National Baptist Convention and the Progressive National Baptist Convention.

Recently, criticism has been published surrounding the lack of diversity in mainline and evangelical Baptist churches, including accusations of white supremacy leveled against some churches.

History

17th century 
Baptists appeared in the American Colonies in the early 17th century among settlers from England. Theologically all Baptists insisted that baptism was the key ritual and should not be administered to children too young to understand the meaning. However some were Arminian holding that God's saving Grace is available to everyone, and others followed Calvinist orthodoxy, which said Grace was available only to the predestined "elect".

Rhode Island and Providence Plantations

Roger Williams and John Clarke, his compatriot in working for religious freedom, are credited with founding the Baptist faith in North America. In 1638, Williams established the First Baptist Church in America in Providence, Rhode Island and Clarke was the minister in Newport, Rhode Island when it was organized as First Baptist Church in Newport in 1644. No one disputed the earlier origins of the Providence church until 1847 when the pastor of the Newport church claimed that his church was first. According to a Baptist historian who has researched the matter extensively, "There is much debate over the centuries as to whether the Providence or Newport church deserved the place of 'first' Baptist congregation in America. Exact records for both congregations are lacking." Today, almost without exception Baptist historians agree that the Providence church came first. In 1764, leading Baptist ministers the Reverend James Manning, the Reverend Isaac Backus, the Reverend Samuel Stillman, the Reverend Morgan Edwards and the Reverend John Gano established The College in the English Colony of Rhode Island and Providence Plantations, the seventh institution of higher education in the original Thirteen Colonies, with the specific goal of serving as a sanctuary for Baptists who were not widely welcomed at the other institutions which were closely associated with the Congregationalist churches (Harvard College, Yale College, and the College of New Jersey) and the Church of England (the Academy of Philadelphia, King's College and the College of William and Mary).

Early controversies
Beginning in Providence in 1636–1637, Roger Williams founded a colony in which religion and citizenship were separated. This same principle was continued in the first charter of 1644 and affirmed by the newly created colonial government in 1647. This principle was explicitly affirmed in the Charter of 1663 which John Clarke wrote and secured. Rhode Island and Providence Plantations was regarded by the neighboring colonies with undisguised horror, and Massachusetts Bay, Plymouth, and Connecticut spent the next 100 years trying to dismember the "heretic" colony. The other colonies passed laws to outlaw Baptists and Quakers, leading to the hanging of four Quakers in Massachusetts. When Harvard's first president Henry Dunster abandoned Puritanism in favor of the Baptist faith in 1653, he provoked a controversy that highlighted two distinct approaches to dealing with dissent in the Massachusetts Bay Colony. The colony's Puritan leaders, whose own religion was born of dissent from mainstream Church of England, generally worked for reconciliation with members who questioned matters of Puritan theology but responded much more harshly to outright rejection of Puritanism. Dunster's conflict with the colony's magistrates began when he failed to have his infant son baptized, believing, as a newly converted Baptist, that only adults should be baptized. Efforts to restore Dunster to Puritan orthodoxy failed, and his apostasy proved untenable to colony leaders who had entrusted him, in his job as Harvard's president, to uphold the colony's religious mission. Thus, he represented a threat to the stability of theocratic society. Dunster exiled himself in 1654 and moved to nearby Plymouth Colony, where he died in 1658.

18th century 
Before the American Revolution about 494 Baptist congregations existed in the United States. That number had risen to 1152 U.S. Baptist congregations by 1795.

Revolutionary Virginia

Isaac (1974) analyzes the rise of the Baptist Church in Virginia, with emphasis on evangelicalism and social life. There was a sharp contrast between the austerity of the plain-living Baptists and the opulence of the Anglican planters, who controlled local government. Baptist church discipline, mistaken by the gentry for radicalism, served to ameliorate disorder. The struggle for religious toleration erupted and played out during the American Revolution, as the Baptists worked to disestablish the Anglican church. Beeman (1978) explores the conflict in one Virginia locality, showing that as population became more dense, the county court and the Anglican Church increased their authority. The Baptists protested vigorously; the resulting social disorder resulted chiefly from the ruling gentry's disregard of public need. The vitality of the religious opposition made the conflict between 'evangelical' and 'gentry' styles a bitter one. Kroll-Smith (1984) suggests the strength of the evangelical movement's organization determined its ability to mobilize power outside the conventional authority structure.

In 1793, the Virginia Baptist General Committee, composed of representatives from Baptist institutions from across Virginia, passed a resolution that slavery was not a moral or religious issue and thus decisions surrounding slavery should be left up to politicians.

Slavery in Baptist churches 

In the 1770s, White Baptists went on conversion missions in the Southern United States as a part of the period known as a Great Awakening. The concept of equality in the eyes of God caused many slaves to convert to Baptism, however, slaves were still urged by white clergy to remain obedient to their masters. Out of fear that Black churches would lead to rebellion, white slave owners required converted slaves to attend white churches. The result of this was the creation of "hush harbors" where slaves would secretly blend Christianity with their African religions and practices, creating their own communities. Some of these spaces were also used to plot against slaveowners, such as the 1831 rebellion in Virginia led by Nat Turner, a Baptist preacher in his community.

19th century

Slavery and "racial" segregation 

In 19th century Virginia, slaves applying for membership in Baptist churches were required to get written approval from their master to join a congregation. Once they were a part of the congregation Black members would have separate Black deacons who oversaw them.

The Baptist churches in America, like the country, split in two over the issue of slavery in the United States.

In 1840, the Board of Managers of the Baptist General Convention for Foreign Missions repeated that the slavery question, which it never mentions by name, is not relevant to their work. It already speaks of the question of "the continuance of Christian fellowship between northern and southern churches."

In 1841, at the annual meeting in Baltimore, "leading ministers and members of the Denomination had signed a document repudiating the course of anti-slavery Baptists, and pronouncing the disfellowship of slaveholders an innovation unsanctioned by the usages of the denomination." There was set up an American Baptist Free Mission Society in 1842, whose founding President was Cyrus Pitt Grosvenor.

Struggling to gain a foothold in the South, after the American Revolution, the next generation of Southern Baptist preachers accommodated themselves to the leadership of Southern society. Rather than challenging the gentry on slavery and urging manumission (as did the Quakers and Methodists), they began to interpret the Bible as supporting the practice of slavery and encouraged good paternalistic practices by slaveholders. They preached to slaves to accept their places and obey their masters. In the two decades after the Revolution during the Second Great Awakening, Baptist preachers abandoned their pleas that slaves be manumitted.

When the Alabama State Convention called on the Foreign Mission Board to explicitly allow slaveholders as missionaries, the board responded:

In Baptist churches in both free and slaveholding states during this period, people of color were required to sit in a segregated "negro pew" regardless of whether they were members of the church, were licensed ministers, or even were invited into the pews of other white churchgoers.

Southern Baptist Convention

The Home Mission Society gave a statement saying that a person could not be a missionary and keep his slaves as property. This caused the Home Mission Society to separate northern and southern divisions. In 1845, the Southern Baptist Convention split from mainline Baptism over the issue of whether slaveholders should be allowed to be appointed as missionaries.

In 1872, Henry Tupper of the Southern Baptist Convention's Foreign Mission Board appointed Edmonia Moon for missionary service. She was the first woman to receive this honor. In 1888, the Woman's Missionary Union was instituted. Women were recognized and encouraged to form missionary circles and children's bands in churches and Sunday Schools.

Formation of the Black Baptist convention

During Reconstruction, policies and practices such as literacy tests, poll taxes, and racial violence lead to the continued disenfranchisement of freed slaves in the South. According to author Evelyn Brooks Higginbotham, it was this lack of political power and other liberties which led the Black church to become a source of community, education, economic power, leadership, and development in post Civil War America.

In 1895, the National Baptist Convention, USA was formed.

20th century

The growth of the Black Baptist convention 
In 1906, the National Baptist Convention, USA had 2,261,607 members, representing 61.4% of all Black churchgoers in the country. By 1916, that number had grown to 2,938,579, a membership larger than either the Northern or Southern Baptist conventions had at the time.

Organization
Though each Baptist church is autonomous, Baptists have traditionally organized into associations of like-minded churches for mutual edification, consultation, and ministerial support. The constituency of these associations is based on geographical and doctrinal criteria. Many such associations of Baptist churches have developed in the United States since Baptists first came to the continent.

Until the early 19th century these Baptist associations tended to center on a local or regional area where the constituent churches could conveniently meet. However, beginning with the spread of the Philadelphia Baptist Association beyond its original bounds and the rise of the modern missions movement, Baptists began to move towards developing national associations.

The first national association was the Triennial Convention, founded in the early 19th century, which met every three years. The Triennial Convention was a loose organization with the purpose of raising funds for various independent benevolent, educational and mission societies.

Over the years, other nationwide Baptist associations have originated as divisions from these two major groups. There are a few smaller associations that have never identified with any of the national organizations, as well as many Independent Baptist churches that are not part of any organization, local or national.

Practices and Beliefs 

In the United States, there are some Baptist groups that support and actively attempt to maintain the separation of church and state. At least 14 Baptist bodies, including the Cooperative Baptist Fellowship, the Baptist General Convention of Texas, the National Baptist Convention, USA, Inc., and American Baptist Churches USA financially and ideologically support the mission of the Baptist Joint Committee for Religious Liberty. This organization tries to uphold the traditional Baptist principle of the separation of church and state. On the issue of school prayer, for instance, the Baptist Joint Committee argues that prayer is most pleasing to God when offered voluntarily, not when the government compels its observance.

Major Baptist denominations in the U.S.

In addition, there are many Independent Baptist churches not aligned with any group.

Statewide Baptist organizations 

 Baptist General Convention of Oklahoma
 Baptist General Convention of Texas : 4,200 congregations, 1.7  million members
 Baptist General Association of Virginia (BGAV): 1,400 congregations, 400,000 member
 District of Columbia Baptist Convention
 Minnesota Baptist Association
 New England Evangelical Baptist Fellowship
 Southern Baptists of Texas Convention
 Spiritual Baptist Archdiocese of New York, Inc.
 Wisconsin Fellowship of Baptist Churches

Evangelical Baptist Conventions 
According to the Pew Research Center's 2014 Religious Landscape Study, 9.2% of Americans belong to Evangelical Baptist congregations. These include the Southern Baptist Convention (5.3%), the Independent Convention (2.5%), the Missionary Convention (less than 0.3%), the Conservative Baptist Association of America (less than 0.3%), the Free Will Convention (less than 0.3%), the General Assembly of Regular Baptists (less than 0.3%), and other evangelical conventions (1%). In 2006, the Southern Baptist Convention (SBC) was the largest non-Catholic denomination in the United States.

Historically Black Baptist churches

Before the American Civil War, most African American Baptists were, with some notable exceptions, members of the same churches as the whites (though often relegated to a segregated status within the church). After the war they left the white churches to start separate churches and associations.

Today there are several historically African-American groups in the United States, including the National Baptist Convention, USA, Inc., the National Baptist Convention of America, and others. A good number of African-American Baptist churches are dually aligned with a traditionally African American group and the ABCUSA, the Southern Baptist Convention, or the Cooperative Baptist Fellowship.

According to a Pew Research survey conducted in 2014, 4% of Americans belong to historically Black Baptist congregations, including the National Baptist Convention (1.4%), the Progressive Convention (0.3%), the Missionary Convention (0.3%), Independent Conventions (less than 0.3%), and other historically Black conventions (1.8%).

Mainline Baptist Conventions 
According to a 2014 Pew Research survey, 2.1% of Americans belonged to Mainline Baptist congregations. These include the American Baptist Convention (1.5%) and other mainline Baptist conventions (0.6%).

Independent (non-aligned) Baptist churches

  
Independent Baptist churches are completely independent of any association or group, though they usually maintain some sort of fellowship with like-minded churches. They share the traditional Baptist doctrinal distinctives, but they adhere to what they see as a Biblical principle of churches' individuality.

Independent Baptists believe that this approach to ministry leaves pastors and people in the church free to work as a local ministry, instead of national work, which, in their view, can be less efficient.

Independent Baptists are strictly Biblicist in their theology, adhering to the traditional Baptist understanding of the Bible and of faith. The same doctrinal variations that exist within (or between) the Baptist associations exist among Independent Baptists.

Historical congregations and churches

Oldest Baptist congregations 

First Baptist Church of Providence, Rhode Island (1639)
First Baptist Church of Newport, Rhode Island (1644)
Second Baptist Church of Newport, Rhode Island (1656)
First Baptist Church of Swansea, Massachusetts (1663)
First Baptist Church of Boston, Massachusetts (1665)
Six Principle Baptist Church, Rhode Island (1665)
Pennepek Baptist Church, Pennsylvania (1688)
Middletown Baptist Church, New Jersey (1688)
Piscataway Baptist Church, New Jersey (1689)
Cohansey Baptist Church, New Jersey (1689)
First Baptist Church of Charleston, South Carolina (1696)
First Baptist Church of Philadelphia, Pennsylvania (1698)

Oldest Black Baptist congregations 

First African Baptist Church, Savannah, Georgia (~1774)
Silver Bluff Baptist Church, Aiken County, South Carolina (~1774)
First Baptist Church, Petersburg, Virginia (~1774)
First African Baptist Church, Lexington, Kentucky (1790)
Gillfield Baptist Church, Petersburg, Virginia (1797)
First African Baptist Church, Boston, Massachusetts (1805)
Abyissinian Baptist Church, New York City, New York (1808)
African Huntsville Church (St. Bartley Primitive Baptist Church), Huntsville, Alabama (1808)
First African Baptist Church, Philadelphia, Pennsylvania (1809)

Oldest surviving Baptist meeting houses

Six Principle Baptist Church, Rhode Island (1703)
Seventh Day Baptist Meeting House, Rhode Island (1730)
Yellow Meeting house, New Jersey (1737)
Welsh Tract Baptist Church, Delaware (1746)
Hornbine Baptist Church, Massachusetts (1757)
Southampton Baptist Church and Cemetery, Pennsylvania (1772)
First Baptist Church of Providence, Rhode Island (1775)
Mount Bethel Baptist Meeting House, New Jersey (1786)
Baptist Society Meeting House, Massachusetts (1790)
Salisbury Baptist Church, New Hampshire (1791)
Primitive Baptist Church of Brookfield, New York (1792)
Old Providence Church, Kentucky (1793)   
North Yarmouth and Freeport Baptist Meetinghouse, Maine (1796)
Island Ford Baptist Church, Jonesville, NC (1806)
African Meeting House, Boston, MA (1806)

Baptist educational institutions

Since the founding of Brown University in Providence, Rhode Island in 1764, Baptists have founded various institutions around the United States to assist congregants in Biblical literacy and to train clergy educated in the Bible and the original Biblical languages. Some of these schools such as Brown University and Bates College eventually became secularized, but others have maintained close bonds with their original founding groups and goals. Most Baptist churches also offer less formal Biblical education in Sunday schools, and some Baptist groups, such as churches led by John Piper offer online educational materials.

Independent Baptists also operate educational institutions such as:
West Coast Baptist College, Lancaster, California
Baptist Bible College, Springfield, Missouri
Hyles Anderson College, Crown Point, Indiana
Liberty University, Lynchburg, Virginia
Northland Baptist Bible College, Dunbar, Wisconsin,
Pensacola Christian College, Pensacola, Florida
 Providence Baptist College, Elgin, Illinois
 New England Baptist College, Southington, Connecticut
Heartland Baptist Bible College, Oklahoma City, OK

Demographics 
In a study published in 2014, using data from The National Survey of American Life: Coping with Stress in the 21st Century (NSAL), 49.08% of African American respondents identified as Baptist. In a 2001 ABC News/Beliefnet poll, 48% of Black Americans and 13% of White Americans identified as Baptist.

Baptist image in United States 

According to surveys, at least half of Americans have a negative view of the Baptist faith.

To avoid being mistakenly associated with fundamentalist groups, many moderate Baptist churches have adopted names such as "Community Church" or "Community Chapel" that leave out the denomination's name. This fits into a general trend by church planters from many denominations to de-accentuate their denomination's name.

Many independent Baptist congregations are staunch fundamentalists, regarding all Baptist associations as too liberal for them to join. Many of these congregations have a history of employing evangelism techniques that critics consider too extreme and abrasive for modern American culture.

Criticism of Baptist churches

Racism and lack of diversity 
A 2020 New Yorker article suggested that white Protestantism, which includes both mainline and evangelical Baptism, has had a lasting legacy of white supremacy in the United States.

Racial diversity and attitudes towards race tend to vary by congregation as Baptist churches tend to only be loosely associated with one another. However a 1999 study concluded only 8% of Christian churches had no single race making up more than 80% of the congregation. This same year, a study on Southern Baptist churches concluded that the mean Simpson's Diversity Index for race in the Southern Baptists Church was 0.098, with 0 being perfect homogeneity and 1 being complete evenness. It was also concluded that the average Southern Baptist church had more than 90% non-Hispanic White members. However, the 22.6% of Southern Baptist churches that employed small groups had greater diversity than those that did not. A 1998 case study found that theologically liberal congregations were no more likely than their conservative counterparts to foster racial diversity, but that instead placing emphasis on local growth, community mindsets, and inclusivity impacted the ability of Baptist churches to attract a multiracial congregation.

See also

Baptists
 Baptists in Canada
 Racial segregation of churches in the United States

Bibliography
 Harrison, Paul M. Authority and Power in the Free Church Tradition: A Social Case Study of the American Baptist Convention Princeton University Press, 1959.
 Heyrman, Christine Leigh. Southern Cross: The Beginnings of the Bible Belt (1997).
 Isaac, Rhy. "Evangelical Revolt: The Nature of the Baptists' Challenge to the Traditional Order in Virginia, 1765 to 1775," William and Mary Quarterly, 31 (July 1974), 345–68. in JSTOR
 Johnson, Charles A. The Frontier Camp Meeting: Religion's Harvest Time (1955) online edition
 Kidd, Thomas S. and Barry Hankins. Baptists in America: A History (2015)
 Leonard, Bill J. Baptist Ways: A History (2003), comprehensive international history
 Leonard, Bill J. Baptists in America. (2005), general survey and history by leading Southern Baptist
 Leonard, Bill J. "Independent Baptists: from Sectarian Minority to 'Moral Majority'". Church History. Volume: 56. Issue: 4. 1987. pp 504+. online edition
 Najar, Monica. Evangelizing the South: A Social History of Church and State in Early America (2008). 252 pp.
 Pestana, Carla Gardina. Quakers and Baptists in Colonial Massachusetts (2004) excerpt and text search
 Rawlyk, George. Champions of the Truth: Fundamentalism, Modernism, and the Maritime Baptists (1990), on Baptists in Canada.
 Spain, Rufus. At Ease in Zion: Social History of Southern Baptists, 1865-1900 (1967)
 Spangler, Jewel L. "Becoming Baptists: Conversion in Colonial and Early National Virginia" Journal of Southern History. Volume: 67. Issue: 2. 2001. pp 243+ online edition
 Stringer, Phil. The Faithful Baptist Witness, Landmark Baptist Press, 1998.
 Torbet, Robert G. A History of the Baptists, Judson Press, 1950.
 Underwood, A. C. A History of the English Baptists. London: Kingsgate Press, 1947.
 Wills, Gregory A. Democratic Religion: Freedom, Authority, and Church Discipline in the Baptist South, 1785–1900, (1997) online edition

Black Baptists
 Gavins; Raymond. The Perils and Prospects of Southern Black Leadership: Gordon Blaine Hancock, 1884–1970 Duke University Press, 1977.
 Harvey, Paul. Redeeming the South: Religious Cultures and Racial Identities among Southern Baptists, 1865–1925 University of North Carolina Press, 1997. online edition
 Pitts, Walter F. Old Ship of Zion: The Afro-Baptist Ritual in the African Diaspora Oxford University Press, 1996.

Primary sources
 McBeth, H. Leon, (ed.) A Sourcebook for Baptist Heritage (1990), primary sources for Baptist history.
 McGlothlin, W. J. (ed.) Baptist Confessions of Faith. Philadelphia: The American Baptist Publication Society, 1911.
 Underhill, Edward Bean (ed.). Confessions of Faith and Other Documents of the Baptist Churches of England in the 17th century. London: The Hanserd Knollys Society, 1854.

References

External links 
 Map of USA showing Percentage of Baptist Population in each county – Department of Geography & Meteorology
 Donald D. Schmeltekopf and Dianna M. Vitanza, Baptist Identity and Christian Higher Education